Chancel Ilunga Sankuru (born 28 December 1995 in Lubumbashi) is a Congolese middle-distance runner. At the 2012 Summer Olympics, she competed in the Women's 1500 metres.

References

1995 births
Living people
Democratic Republic of the Congo female middle-distance runners
Olympic athletes of the Democratic Republic of the Congo
Athletes (track and field) at the 2012 Summer Olympics
People from Lubumbashi
21st-century Democratic Republic of the Congo people